Arbanija  is a village on Čiovo Island, Croatia. The settlement is administered as a part of the City of Trogir and Split-Dalmatia County. According to the 2011 census, the village has 374 inhabitants. It is connected by the D126 state road.

The village is named after the Arbanasi, a group of ethnic Albanians that settled in several places on Croatia's Adriatic coast in the 18th century.

Sources

Populated coastal places in Croatia
Populated places in Split-Dalmatia County